Tiamat is a deity in Babylonian mythology.

Tiamat may also refer to:

Video games and role playing games
Tiamat, a boss monster in Darksiders
Tiamat, a reoccurring demon in the Shin Megami Tensei series
Tiamat (Dungeons & Dragons), a five-headed dragon goddess in Dungeons & Dragons
Titania (Fire Emblem), or Tiamat, a character in Fire Emblem 
Tiamat (ARK Survival Evolved), a map in the survival game ARK Survival Evolved
Tiamat, a fictional planet in the space game Fury3
Tiamat, a summon in the role playing game Golden Sun
Tiamat, a Mantis ship in the real time strategy Conquest: Frontier Wars
Tiamat, a mapmaker in Halo: Custom Edition
Tiamat, a boss enemy in the platform adventure game La-Mulana
Tiamat, a weapon in League of Legends
Tiamat, a recurring monster in the Final Fantasy franchise
Tiamat, a boss in Tales of Zestiria
The Bracelet of Tiamat, a bracelet stolen at the beginning of Rhythm Thief and the Emperor's Treasure that sets off the plot

Other media
Tiamat, a planet in the Joan D. Vinge novel The Snow Queen
Tiamat, an infant dragon in the  Bruce Coville novel Jeremy Thatcher, Dragon Hatcher
Tiamat the Dragon Empress, a character in the anime and manga Mon Colle Knights
Tiamat is the name of the comet whose fragments fall to Earth and  destroy the town of Itomori in the 2016 Japanese animated romantic fantasy  film Your Name

Other
Tiamat (band), a Swedish gothic metal band
Tiamat (hypothetical planet), a planet in pseudoscientific literature
Tiamat (yacht), a yacht racing team
JB-3 Tiamat, a World War II-era American air-to-air missile project 
Tiamat (rocket), a U.S. sounding rocket

See also
 Tiamut, also known as the Dreaming Celestial, a fictional character in the Marvel Comics